Hans-Gert Jahn (born 21 August 1945) is a German biathlete. He competed in the 4 x 7.5 kilometre relay event at the 1968 Winter Olympics.

References

External links
 

1945 births
Living people
German male biathletes
Olympic biathletes of East Germany
Biathletes at the 1968 Winter Olympics
People from Mittelsachsen
Sportspeople from Saxony